Pärispea is a village in Kuusalu Parish in Harju County in northern Estonia.  The village  has a population of 109 (as of 1 January 2009). The village is situated in the northern end of the Pärispea Peninsula.

Pärispea is the northernmost settlement in mainland Estonia and the contiguous states of the European Union, with Cape Purekkari a kilometer north of the village being the northernmost point.

References

Villages in Harju County